Kobayakawa is a Japanese surname. Notable people with the surname include:

, Japanese daimyō
, Japanese samurai
, Japanese baseball player
, Japanese samurai and daimyō

Fictional characters
, a character in the manga series World Trigger
, protagonist of the manga series You're Under Arrest
, a character in the manga series Hunter × Hunter
, protagonist of the manga series Eyeshield 21
, a character in the manga series Lucky Star

See also
Kobayakawa clan, a Japanese samurai clan

Japanese-language surnames